Esrom is an unincorporated community in Barton County, in the U.S. state of Missouri.

History
A post office called Esrom was established in 1880, and remained in operation until 1904. The name Esrom appears to be biblical in origin.

References

Unincorporated communities in Barton County, Missouri
Unincorporated communities in Missouri